Jovany Alberto Campusano Villega (born 11 January 1993) is a Chilean footballer who currently plays for Primera División de Chile club Club Universidad de Chile as an defensive midfielder.

Career

Club career
Campusano started his football career at the local professional of his city Deportes La Serena, joining to the youth ranks in 2007, aged 14. He finally, three years later, was promoted to the first adult team for the 2011 season and his professional debut came on 17 April of the same year in a 3–1 home victory over Santiago Wanderers at La Portada Stadium, playing just 11 minutes of that match for then play for first time in his career, the full 90 minutes, in a match against Universidad Católica.

References

External links
 Giovanni Campusano at Football-Lineups
 
 
 Campusano's profile at I'm scouting

1993 births
Living people
People from La Serena
People from Elqui Province
Chilean footballers
Chilean Primera División players
Deportes La Serena footballers
Ñublense footballers
Association football midfielders